Fântânele is a commune in Mureș County, Transylvania, Romania composed of six villages:
Bordoșiu / Bordos
Călimănești / Kelementelke
Cibu / Csöb
Fântânele
Roua / Rava  
Viforoasa / Havadtő

The commune is located in the southern part of the county,  from the county seat, Târgu Mureș, on the border with Harghita County.

Demographics
The commune has a Székely Hungarian majority. According to the 2011 census it has a population of 4,595 of which 93.84% or 4,312 are Hungarian.

See also
List of Hungarian exonyms (Mureș County)

References

Communes in Mureș County
Localities in Transylvania